The Independent was an English-language daily newspaper published in Dhaka, Bangladesh. It was owned by Beximco Group of Bangladesh. The last executive editor of the newspaper was Shamim Abdullah Zahedy.

History 
On 26 March 1995, Beximco Group launched The Independent.

In October 2010, the Independent newspaper was relaunched.

The newspaper officially shut down on 30 January 2022. Earlier in April 2020, it ceased printed publication due to COVID-19 pandemic.

On 31 January 2022, The Independent was closed down.

See also
 The Daily Ittefaq
 The Daily Star (Bangladesh)
 Daily Sun (Bangladesh)
 List of newspapers in Bangladesh
 New Age
 Prothom Alo

References

Daily newspapers published in Bangladesh
English-language newspapers published in Bangladesh
Newspapers published in Dhaka
Defunct newspapers published in Bangladesh